Mert Zeki Korkmaz (born August 16, 1971 in İstanbul) is a retired Turkish footballer.

Early life
Korkmaz was born in 1971. He is younger brother of Bülent Korkmaz, a football player.

Career
Korkmaz played as a defender, and was known for his fighting spirit and professional approach to the game. 

A product of Galatasaray S.K.'s youth system, Mert played there from 1993-1997. He went on to represent Kocaelispor, Gaziantepspor, Malatyaspor and İstanbul Büyükşehir Belediyespor, retiring in 2008.

Korkmaz was capped five times by Turkey.

Following his retirement Korkmaz began to work as a football manager for İstanbul Büyükşehir Belediyespor. He was assistant coach of Kocaelispor, Kasımpaşa, Konyaspor ve Ümraniyespor. Next he served as the coach of Yeni Malatyaspor, Tarsus İdman Yurdu ve Nevşehir Belediyespor.

References

External links
Futbolmerkezi.com profile 

1971 births
Living people
Turkish footballers
Turkey international footballers
Galatasaray S.K. footballers
Gaziantepspor footballers
Kocaelispor footballers
Malatyaspor footballers
İstanbul Başakşehir F.K. players
Süper Lig players

Association football defenders